To Be Continued is an album by guitarist Terje Rypdal, bassist Miroslav Vitous and drummer Jack DeJohnette recorded in 1981 and released on the ECM label.

Reception
The Allmusic review by Paul Collins awarded the album 4½ stars stating "Essentially a continuation of Rypdal Vitous DeJohnette, this album somewhat lacks the atmospheric keyboards of its predecessor. It is nonetheless quite compelling".

Track listing
All compositions by Terje Rypdal except as indicated
 "Maya" - 10:18   
 "Mountain in the Clouds" (Miroslav Vitous) - 4:57   
 "Morning Lake" (Vitous) - 7:28   
 "To Be Continued" (Jack DeJohnette) - 9:12   
 "This Morning" (DeJohnette, Vitous, Rypdal) - 5:24   
 "Topplue, Votter & Skjerf" - 3:48   
 "Uncomposed Appendix" - 1:52  
Recorded at Talent Studio in Oslo, Norway in January 1981

Personnel
Terje Rypdal — electric guitars, flute 
Miroslav Vitous — acoustic bass, electric bass, piano
Jack DeJohnette — drums, voice

References

ECM Records albums
Terje Rypdal albums
Miroslav Vitouš albums
Jack DeJohnette albums
1981 albums
Albums produced by Manfred Eicher